These Are the Days is the sixth studio album by the American rock band Lit. It was released on December 15, 2017. In a musical departure from their previous records, this album showcases the band blending their traditional alternative rock sound with country rock. It is their only album that does not feature an official drummer and is their last album with guitarist Ryan Gillmor as he departed the band following the recording sessions.

Track listing

Personnel
Lit
 A. Jay Popoff – lead vocals
 Jeremy Popoff – lead guitar, backing vocals
 Kevin Baldes – bass guitar, backing vocals
 Ryan Gillmor – guitar, backing vocals

References

2017 albums
Lit (band) albums